Freeburg can refer to:
Freeburg, Illinois
Freeburg, Minnesota
Freeburg, Missouri
Freeburg, Ohio
Freeburg, Pennsylvania
Fictional city in video game This Is the Police.